Nicola D'Agostino (born 24 April 1958 in Vibo Valentia) is an Italian politician.

He was a member of the centre-right party The People of Freedom and was elected Mayor of Vibo Valentia at the 2010 Italian local elections. He took office on 13 April 2010 and served until 3 June 2015.

See also
2010 Italian local elections
List of mayors of Vibo Valentia

References

External links
 

1958 births
Living people
Mayors of Vibo Valentia
The People of Freedom politicians
Forza Italia (2013) politicians
People from Vibo Valentia